The 2011 AIBA World Boxing Championships was held at the Heydar Aliyev Sports and Exhibition Complex in Baku, Azerbaijan from September 22 to October 10, 2011.

The competition ran under the supervision of the world's governing body for amateur boxing, the AIBA, and followed on from the biggest World Championships in AIBA history which was held in Milan, Italy in 2009.

This world championship served as a qualifier for the 2012 Summer Olympics. 685 boxers participated from 127 countries.

The preliminary rounds started on September 26 with the finals being held on October 10.

Results

Medal table

Medal summary

Participating countries
685 competitors from 127 countries participated.

  (5)
  (4)
  (8)
  (4)
  (7)
  (7)
  (10)
  (1)
  (9)
  (2)
  (2)
  (10)
  (1)
  (2)
  (5)
  (2)
  (6)
  (10)
  (2)
  (5)
  (2)
  (2)
  (5)
  (10)
  (4)
  (7)
  (4)
  (1)
  (5)
  (10)
  (10)
  (5)
  (4)
  (4)
  (5)
  (8)
  (9)
  (3)
  (3)
  (8)
  (1)
  (8)
  (7)
  (4)
  (10)
  (10)
  (7)
 
  (9)
  (1)
  (5)
  (3)
  (2)
  (4)
  (10)
  (1)
  (5)
  (10)
  (9)
  (8)
  (10)
  (2)
  (9)
  (2)
  (8)
  (4)
  (4)
  (7)
  (9)
  (10)
  (9)
  (1)
  (4)
  (2)
  (1)
  (6)
  (10)
  (8)
  (8)
  (8)
  (2)
  (9)
  (2)
  (1)
  (2)
  (3)
  (4)
  (2)
  (2)
  (3)
  (6)
  (6)
  (10)
  (1)
  (8)
  (10)
  (6)
  (2)
  (1)
  (5)
  (5)
  (4)
  (4)
  (9)
  (6)
  (1)
  (4)
  (8)
  (4)
  (3)
  (1)
  (6)
  (10)
  (8)
  (6)
  (8)
  (2)
  (2)
  (2)
  (4)
  (10)
  (10)
  (10)
  (10)
  (10)
  (8)
  (1)

References

External links
 
 Results

 
AIBA World Boxing Championships
AIBA World Boxing Championships
2011
AIBA World Boxing Championships
AIBA World Boxing Championships
2010s in Baku
September 2011 sports events in Asia
October 2011 sports events in Asia